Tetramorium plumosum is a species of ant in the subfamily Myrmicinae. This species was described by Bolton in 1980. It is currently only known from Eswatini (Swaziland).

References 

plumosum
Endemic fauna of Eswatini